Aristaless related homeobox is a protein that in humans is encoded by the ARX gene.

Function 

This gene is a homeobox-containing gene expressed during development. The expressed protein contains two conserved domains, a C-peptide (or aristaless domain) and the prd-like class homeobox domain. It is a member of the group-II aristaless-related protein family whose members are expressed primarily in the central and/or peripheral nervous system. This gene is involved in CNS and pancreas development.

Clinical significance 

Mutation in the ARX gene are associated with X-linked intellectual disability, lissencephaly, as well as hypoglycemia (in mice).

See also
 homeobox

References

Further reading

External links
 
 

Transcription factors